"Love You Like a Love Song" is a song by American band Selena Gomez & the Scene recorded for their third studio album When the Sun Goes Down (2011). It was released as the second single from the album internationally. The song was released for digital download on June 17, 2011, and serviced to mainstream radios on August 16, 2011, in the United States, through Hollywood Records.

It was written by Antonina Armato and Tim James while both receive production credits under the stage-name Rock Mafia. Additional songwriting comes from Adam Schmalholz, also known as "IN-Q", while Devrim Karaoglu co-produced the track. The song, according to Gomez, was meant to sound different from her previous material, achieving a "high fashion" sound. "Love You Like a Love Song" is a midtempo electropop and dance-pop song with a Euro disco rhythm. The lyrics deal with a love relationship in its primary stage.

"Love You Like a Love Song" was a success in North America, peaking at number twenty-two on the Billboard Hot 100 and number ten on the Canadian Hot 100. It stands as the band's most successful single in the United States, lasting the longest on the chart, selling more than two million copies and earning a penta-platinum certification by the Recording Industry Association of America (RIAA). The song peaked at number one in Russia, inside the top ten in Hungary, Mexico and Slovakia, and earned gold certifications in Australia and Sweden, and a platinum one in Norway. In 2022, Billboard ranked the song as the biggest hit that peaked at number 22.

The music video for "Love You Like a Love Song" was directed by Geremy Jasper and Georgie Greville. It features Gomez performing the song at a Japanese karaoke bar while scenes of the band performing in different settings are intercut through the video. The video received controversy for the use of paint, later proven to be non-toxic, on a horse. Despite the use of non-toxic paint and supervision by the Humane Society, the scenes with the horses were removed in the final edit.

Background and release
"Love You Like a Love Song" was written and produced by Antonina Armato and Tim James, while they are credited under the stage-name Rock Mafia for the production. Armato and James have collaborated on The Scene's previous songs including "Naturally" and "Tell Me Something I Don't Know" (Kiss & Tell, 2009). A month after the release of "Who Says", there was already talk of a release of a new single, to be called "Love You Like a Song", a rumor that arose when the provisional name of the third studio album was still Otherside. On April 30, 2011, the production/songwriting duo, through Twitter, 'confirmed' "Love You Like a Song" was not correct and the correct name of the song is "Love You Like a Love Song" or "Lovesong". In May, the official name of the song, "Love You Like a Love Song", was confirmed. Armato and James collaborated with Paul Palmer on the song's mix, which was orchestrated at Rock Mafia Studios in Santa Monica, California, while Steve Hammons serves as the mix engineer. Hammons and Ross Hogarth were signed as the song's engineers, while Adam Comstock serves as the second engineer. Brooke Adams performed background vocals with Armato and James. Tim Pierce contributed guitars. The song was then digitally edited by James and Nigel Lundemo.

In an interview with Billboard, Gomez described as a "one of those tracks that's addictive because it's kind of repetitive in the best way. It's one of those songs that you can't get out of your head." In an interview with another publication, Gomez explained what she expected from the record: "This song is fun and I wanted it to be really high fashion and different and I think we have accomplished that. It's basically talking about how crazy you are about someone whenever it's the beginning. It's the honeymoon stage if you will." "Love You Like a Love Song" was released as the second single from When the Sun Goes Down (2011), after the international success of "Who Says", on June 17, 2011, through digital distribution. The song was serviced to contemporary hit radio airplay on August 16, 2011, in the United States.

Composition

"Love You Like a Love Song" is a mid tempo electropop and dance-pop song incorporating a Euro disco rhythm and pulsing beats, According to the digital music sheet published at Musicnotes.com by Universal Music Publishing Group, the song is written in the key of C minor. The song is set in common time and moves through a moderate tempo, having a tempo of 117 beats per minute. Gomez's vocals range from a low register of E3 to a high register of C#5. It has a basic descending fifths sequence of C#m-F#m-B-E-A-D#dim-G#7 with the eighth chord being G# in the verses and C#m in the chorus as its chord progression. It changes to A-E-B-C#m-A-E-G#7-G#7 in the bridge. Lyrically, "Love You like a Love Song" is about a relationship in its honeymoon phase. Kitty Empire of The Guardian commented the song "combines a lyrical weariness beyond her years with some acrylic pump action".

Critical reception
The song received generally mixed reviews from music critics, who criticized its lyrics and Gomez's monotone vocals. John Bergstrom of PopMatters expressed a mixed opinion about the song, writing it "benefits from a great title, and the squishy Eurodisco rhythm is credible, catchy and even sultry. But it's all undone by a stuttering, Max Headroom non-chorus."

Victoria Meng of TheCelebrityCafe, in her review of the single, found faults with the lyrics and the production. Calling the production "sub-par", Meng criticized it for sounding "mechanical" due to the electronic nature, writing "a love song shouldn’t sound mechanical unless it’s deliberately meant to be subversive and to highlight dark, pathological obsessions like in many of Lady Gaga's songs." Meng also criticized it for the use of monotone vocals and Auto-Tune, in regards to a love song which she claims should be "passionate". Meng found the lyrics to be "mediocre", writing "to surround them with a beautiful tune" would help them stand out. Blair Kelly of musicOMH expressed similar feelings towards the song; she deemed it "forgettable" and stated it and "Bang Bang Bang" were both "wannabe electro-pop songs which lack both lyrical merit and a really catchy hook to make up for it."

In 2017, Pitchfork (website) called the song "a cult karaoke classic."

Chart performance
"Love You Like a Love Song" was released as the follow up single to "Who Says", which was achieving moderate chart success during the time of the single's release. In the United States, it debuted on the Billboard Hot 100 on the week ending July 9, 2011, at number 71. In the two weeks following the release of When the Sun Goes Down, the song rose to number 66 and number 35. It continued to descend the chart for months, falling outside the top fifty.
"Love You Like a Love Song" got its second wind after November 26, 2011, as it continued rising from the fiftieth position up until March 3, 2012, when it reached a peak of number 22, surpassing the peak made in July 2011. At the end of that month, the song surpassed sales of two million units, becoming their first single to achieve this sales and her highest selling single in the United States. The song also earned the band their second highest-charting single, behind "Who Says", and their longest running single on the Hot 100 at 38 weeks. The song also earned the band the first album to spawn two top thirty hits. On April 20, 2012, the Recording Industry Association of America (RIAA) certified the single double platinum. It has sold 2.7 million copies in the US as of May 2017 and is Gomez's best-selling song in her career.

In Canada, "Love You Like a Love Song" entered the Canadian Hot 100 at number 64 on July 9, 2011. The song rose to number 21 in the following week. It ascended and descended inside the top 30 for eighteen weeks until it peaked at number 10 on November 19, 2011. The song lasted another fifteen weeks inside the top 30 and exited the charts after forty-two weeks.

"Love You Like a Love Song" did not replicate its North American success in Western Europe, though in Belgium, the song was a success, peaking at number 15 and charted for thirteen weeks. In New Zealand, the song entered the singles chart at number 34 and peaked at number 21 two weeks later. In Australia, it peaked at number 48 and, despite lasting two weeks on the chart, was certified gold for shipments of 35,000 units by Australian Recording Industry Association (ARIA). In Sweden, the song peaked at number 41 on the singles chart and earned a gold certification by the Swedish Recording Industry Association (GLF) for shipments of 10,000 units. The song showed similar success across Europe, peaking in the lower end of the top fifty in several other countries, though it went to #1 in Russia staying 20 weeks atop (the most of any song), and top 3 in several other Eastern European countries. It also made #1 in both Taiwan and the People's Republic of China.

Music video

Background and synopsis

The music video was directed by Geremy Jasper and Georgie Greville, who previously worked with Goldfrapp and Florence & The Machine. Gomez considered the video as "the craziest video I've ever done", and commented, "[s]ometimes when you're in love, there are things you can't really explain and it doesn't make sense. That's how I feel when I'm in love." The video was released on June 23, 2011, on VEVO. Around the same time, the video would play during commercial breaks on Disney Channel.

, the video has been viewed more than 640 million times.

It begins with the singer at a Japanese karaoke bar, watching a man sing the band's previous single "Naturally" off-key before he wanders off stage, a scene criticized for being similar to the opening scene of Maroon 5's video for their 2004 single "Sunday Morning". Gomez, who wears a golden disco-style dress, is called to the stage, where she starts to sing the song. As the first line begins, the karaoke machine begins projecting various images of the band in different settings. The first set features Gomez wearing a long black dress with poker-straight hair on a violet-sanded beach. The close ups with her dark sleeveless top, hairstyle, hair color, goth like makeup, and with her hands gesturing towards the camera bear a striking resemblance with Avril Lavigne's Complicated videoclip. She then walks the beach with a long-haired blond male hippie (actor/model Oliver Seitz), and lays in the sand while he plays sitar and time-lapsed clouds speed away overhead. In the chorus, many TV screens show images of Gomez in drag looking similar to 1980s icon Max Headroom.

During the second verse of the song, Gomez and the pianist are in a heavenly cloud-scape, both dressed in a style inspired by the 1984 film Amadeus. She sings atop the triangular piano while he plays. She then glances at a TV screen displaying the next scene. Donning 1950s dress, Gomez rides in the passenger seat of a convertible car driven by a greaser, played by actor Charan Andreas on a Tron-esque computer grid in outer space. The song's breakdown takes place in a large field of fuchsia wheat. Gomez sports a bejeweled bustier, black tutu, and black thigh-high boots while playing piñata with a pink lightsaber. She is surrounded by a Mariachi band consisting of The Scene and others playing Roland AX-7 synth keytars and a Yamaha WX5 wind controller. In the video's conclusion, The Scene comes into the bar to watch their lead singer finish her song, as the men from the fantasy sequences are shown to be in the audience as well. Gomez then bows to applause from the small audience. The beach was filmed in Malibu, California.

In a May 2018 interview with Victoria Rodriguez of Seventeen, actor Timothy Granaderos, who portrays the character of Monty in the Gomez-produced Netflix drama 13 Reasons Why, confirmed he played the purple-masked mariachi band member, who plays the Yamaha WX5 wind controller, in the video.

PETA controversy and reception
Before the official release of the music video, a leaked photo from the set of Gomez, the hippie, and two pink-colored horses drew controversy during production. Although the horses were colored using a nontoxic water-soluble vegetable powder, when singer and PETA supporter Pink saw the photo, she assumed the horses had been colored traditionally using toxic paints or dyes. Pink criticized the video, which had not even been released, as "stupid". On her arrival to the video's set, Gomez was reportedly surprised to see the horses were physically colorized, having assumed their color would be added in post-production. 

According to Gomez, she "was not so comfortable with the whole concept" of having horses in the video, and it was later announced the animals would not appear in the final cut of the video, despite on-set supervision from an official of the Humane Society and the horses not having been harmed or endangered in any way. James Dihn of MTV Newsroom commented Gomez was not the first celebrity to be criticized by PETA, naming Britney Spears and her music video for "Circus" (2008), as well as 50 Cent and Lady Gaga, as examples. Following the release on VEVO, Becky Bain of Idolator noted "most of these scenes have absolutely nothing to do with one another", but considered it "pretty entertaining even without pink horses", joking about the PETA controversy. Jocelyn Vena of MTV summarized her review of the music video saying, "Selena Gomez may have been born in 1992, but that doesn't mean that the teen queen can't get a little nostalgic for the '80s."

Live performances
Gomez performed the song on Good Morning America on June 17, 2011. The song has also been performed on the UK program Daybreak on July 8, 2011. She also performed it at the Teen Choice Awards on Sunday, August 7, 2011. Gomez performed the song on "The Tonight Show with Jay Leno" on September 19, 2011. The song was also performed on The Ellen DeGeneres Show on November 17, 2011. Gomez and her band performed the song at their first headlining tour We Own the Night Tour.

Gomez and her band won a Teen Choice Award for Best Love Song and also won Teen Choice Award for Best Group after they performed their song at the show.

Track listing

Remixes EP
 "Love You Like a Love Song" (Radio Version) - 3:09
 "Love You Like a Love Song" (Radio Instrumental) - 3:06
 "Love You Like a Love Song" (The Alias Radio Mix) - 3:28
 "Love You Like a Love Song" (The Alias Club Mix) - 5:47

Credits and Personnel
Selena Gomez – lead vocals, background vocals	
Antonina Armato, Tim James, Adam Schmalholz – songwriters
Rock Mafia, Devrim Karaoglu – producer

Legacy
In 2012, Naya Rivera performed the song as her character Santana Lopez in the third-season episode "Prom-asaurus" of the television series Glee.

RuPaul's Drag Race contestant Willam Belli parodied the song on his album The Wreckoning, entitled "Love You Like a Big Schlong".

The song was featured in the episode "No, You Can’t Sit With Us" of Suburgatory.

The song was covered by Marshall Williams and Kelli Berglund in the Disney Channel television film How to Build a Better Boy, as their characters Albert Banks and Mae Hartley respectively.

The song was featured in the 2012 dance video game Just Dance 4.

In 2014, Cats on Trees released a cover version of the song. It charted on the SNEP, the official French Singles Chart peaking number 44 and 43 at Wallonia.

In 2015, Sami released a cover version of the song.

The song was featured in episode 7 of the Netflix series Ginny and Georgia.

During late 2021 and early 2022, the song has had a huge publicity on the video sharing service and social media TikTok, where slowed and reverbed versions of the song have gained almost 2 million videos and millions of views combined.

Awards and nominations

Charts

Weekly charts

Year-end charts

Certifications

Release history

See also
 List of number-one dance singles of 2011 (U.S.)

References

2011 singles
Electropop songs
Dance-pop songs
Selena Gomez & the Scene songs
Songs written by Antonina Armato
Songs written by Tim James (musician)
Hollywood Records singles
Song recordings produced by Rock Mafia
2011 songs
Songs written by IN-Q
Number-one singles in Russia
Music video controversies